This is a timeline of Tajikistani history, comprising important legal and territorial changes and political events in Tajikistan and its predecessor states.  To read about the background to these events, see History of Tajikistan.

15th century

16th century

17th century

18th century

19th century

20th century

21st century

Tajikistani
Years in Tajikistan
Tajikistan history-related lists